Arthur William Kopp (February 28, 1874 – June 2, 1967) was a U.S. Representative from Wisconsin.

Born in Bigpatch, Wisconsin, Kopp attended the common schools of Grant County, Wisconsin. He graduated from the State normal school, now the University of Wisconsin–Platteville in Platteville, Wisconsin, in 1895. He taught school for three years. He graduated from the law department of the University of Wisconsin–Madison in 1900, and was admitted to the bar the same year and commenced practice in Platteville, Grant County.
He served as member of the board of aldermen in Platteville from 1903 till 1904, and was the city attorney in 1903 and 1904. He served as district attorney of Grant County from 1904 to 1908.

Kopp was elected as a Republican to the Sixty-first and Sixty-second Congresses (March 4, 1909 - March 3, 1913) representing Wisconsin's 3rd congressional district. He was not a candidate for reelection to the Sixty-third Congress. After congress he resumed the practice of law.

Kopp was elected circuit judge of the fifth judicial district of Wisconsin in 1942 and served until his retirement January 1, 1955. He was a reserve circuit judge after retirement, accepting occasional assignments. He was also a law consultant.

He died in Platteville, Wisconsin, on June 2, 1967. He was interred in Greenwood Cemetery.

Sources

External links

1874 births
1967 deaths
Wisconsin city council members
Wisconsin state court judges
People from Platteville, Wisconsin
University of Wisconsin–Platteville alumni
University of Wisconsin–Madison alumni
University of Wisconsin Law School alumni
Republican Party members of the United States House of Representatives from Wisconsin
People from Smelser, Wisconsin